The 2001 Italian Figure Skating Championships was held in Agorà from January 12 through 13, 2001. Skaters competed in the disciplines of men's singles, ladies' singles, and ice dancing. The results were used to choose the teams to the 2001 World Championships, the 2001 European Championships, and the 2001 World Junior Championships.

Senior results

Men

Ladies

Ice dancing

External links
 results

Italian Figure Skating Championships
2000 in figure skating
Italian Figure Skating Championships, 2001
2001 in Italian sport